Antonio Barbio (born 16 December 1993) is a Portuguese cyclist, who currently rides for UCI Continental team . He competed at the 2016 UEC European Track Championships in the scratch event.

Major results
2011
 1st  Time trial, National Junior Road Championships
2012
 National Under-23 Road Championships
2nd Road race
2nd Time trial
 2nd Overall Volta a Portugal do Futuro
2013
 2nd Road race, National Under-23 Road Championships
 3rd Overall Volta a Portugal do Futuro
2017
 1st Stage 7 Volta a Portugal

References

External links

1993 births
Living people
Portuguese male cyclists
Portuguese track cyclists
People from Torres Vedras